Mattias Saari (born September 15, 1994) is a Swedish ice hockey player. He is currently playing with Timrå IK of the Swedish Hockey League (SHL).

Saari made his Elitserien (now the SHL) debut playing with Timrå IK during the 2012–13 Elitserien playoffs.

References

External links

1994 births
Living people
Swedish ice hockey forwards
Timrå IK players
People from Sundsvall
Sportspeople from Västernorrland County